The 2017–18 Southeast Missouri State Redhawks men's basketball team represented Southeast Missouri State University during the 2017–18 NCAA Division I men's basketball season. The Redhawks, led by third-year head coach Rick Ray, played their home games at the Show Me Center in Cape Girardeau, Missouri as members of the  Ohio Valley Conference. They finished the season 14–17, 8–10 in OVC play to finish in seventh place.

The team was ineligible for postseason play this season due to APR violations.

Previous season
The Redhawks finished the 2016–17 season 15–18, 9–7 in OVC play to finish in second place in the West Division. They defeated Tennessee State in the first round of the OVC tournament to advance to the quarterfinals where they lost to Jacksonville State.

Preseason 
In a vote of conference coaches and sports information directors, SEMO was picked to finish in 10th place in the OVC. Denzel Mahoney was named to the 2017–18 Preseason All-OVC team.

After five years of divisional play in the OVC, the conference eliminated divisions for the 2017–18 season. Additionally, for the first time, each conference team will play 18 conference games.

Roster

Schedule and results

|-
!colspan=9 style=| Exhibition

|-
!colspan=9 style=| Non-conference regular season

|-
!colspan=9 style=| Ohio Valley Conference regular season

References

Southeast Missouri State Redhawks men's basketball seasons
Southeast Missouri State
Southeast Missouri State Redhawks men's basketball
Southeast Missouri State Redhawks men's basketball